This list shows the appearances of all participants in the men's tennis ATP Finals singles since their inception as the Pepsi-Cola Masters in 1970. The tournament is currently held in Pala Alpitour in Turin, Italy.

Qualification

Format

ATP Finals appearances
Key
Current format
 W = winner;
 F = runner-up;
 SF = lost in semi-finals (1972–present);
 RR = lost in Round Robin group stage (1972–1981, 1986–present);
 A = Alternate (did not play from the beginning; 1996–present);
 A' = Alternate (played from the beginning = original player withdrew before the tournament);
 R = withdrew during the tournament (1996–present).
Older format
 QF = lost in quarter-finals (1982–1985);
 R16 = lost in 1st round/Round of 16 (1982–1985);
 3rd–7th = standings in the RR group (1970–1971);
Note
When there are more than eight players listed for any year since 1986, it is usually due to withdrawal by one or more players because of injury. When a player withdraws early in the tournament, his place is filled by the next-highest qualifier. Participants are listed in order of number of appearances and best result with players being active indicated in bold.

References
Tournament website
Tournament info

Final Appearances
ATP